The Case That Shook India: The Verdict That Led To The Emergency is a non-fictional book written by lawyer-activist Prashant Bhushan on the case that set aside Indira Gandhi's election in 1974 which lead to the Emergency followed by a democratic backsliding of the republic.

References

2018 non-fiction books
Cultural depictions of Indira Gandhi
Penguin Books India books